Zbigniew Tęczyński, Zbigniew z Tęczyna (c. 1450–1498) was a Polish sword-bearer of the Crown (1474–1482), chamberlain of Kraków (before 1481–1498), starosta of Malbork (1485–1496), general starosta (starosta generalny) of Prussia, starosta of Kalisz (1495), starosta of Lviv (since 1497) and trustworthy counsellor of Kazimierz IV Jagiellończyk. Member of the Tęczyński family.

References

 
 

1450 births
1498 deaths
Zbigniew